Ludwig Karl Adamovich (born 24 August 1932, in Innsbruck), commonly known as Ludwig Adamovich Jr., is an Austrian constitutional scholar, civil servant, and educator. From 1956 to 1984, Adamovich worked for the Constitutional Service of the Austrian Chancellery; he also taught law at the University of Graz. From 1984 to 2002, he served as the president of the Austrian Constitutional Court. Since 2004, Adamovich has been acting, on an honorary basis, as an advisor on matters of constitutional law to Presidents Heinz Fischer and Alexander Van der Bellen.

Early life 

Ludwig Karl Adamovich was born on 24 August 1932 in Innsbruck.

His father was Ludwig Adamovich Sr., a noted legal scholar and a member of the Austrian Constitutional Court at the time.
The family was conservative; the elder Adamovich had been educated at the Jesuit Kalksburg College, supported the Christian Social Party, and would later become minister of justice for the Austrofascist government of Chancellor Kurt Schuschnigg.
The relationship between father and son was difficult. Adamovich Sr. was controlling and pedantic; Adamovich Jr. was unable to meet his father's expectations either academically or in terms of personality.

Adamovich received his secondary education at the Akademisches Gymnasium.

Career 

After graduating from the Gymnasium, Adamovich enrolled at the University of Vienna to study law, receiving his doctorate in 1954. Adamovich had originally wanted to become a surgeon; his mother descended from a family of physicians. He eventually chose law instead because he feared that his poor talent for mathematics would make it impossible for him to succeed as a student of medicine.

From 1955 to 1956, Adamovich worked in the Lower Austrian provincial administration.
In 1956, Adamovich joined the Constitutional Service in the Chancellery, an office that assists ministries in drafting legislation and in evaluating the constitutionality of draft statutes written elsewhere.
In his spare time, Adamovich continued to pursue academic ambitions.
In 1973, he submitted his habilitation thesis to the University of Vienna; in 1974, he accepted an appointment to professor of public law at the University of Graz. Two years later, he returned to the capital and to the Chancellery; he was now the executive director of the Constitutional Service.
In his 2011 autobiography, Adamovich freely admits that his career was greatly helped by his father's reputation and, especially in its early years, by his family's political connections to the Austrian People's Party.

As from 1 January 1984 Adamovich was appointed president of the Constitutional Court.
He held this position for nineteen years, leaving the court when he reached the mandatory retirement age of seventy in 2002. Adamovich's tenure was a period of modernization; his leadership represented a break with the old ways in several respects. Among other things, Adamovich worked to establish relationships with sibling constitutional courts in other countries, especially with the new constitutional courts created during the 1990s in former Eastern Bloc nations.

In 2004, Adamovich accepted an invitation of then-President Heinz Fischer to join the Presidential Chancellery, on an honorary basis, as an advisor on matters of constitutional law. He stayed on in this capacity when Alexander Van der Bellen replaced Fischer in 2016.

Politics 

Adamovich is considered right of center, although with a permissive, humanistic streak.
He has called himself an "unorthodox conservative".

Immediately after graduating from university, Adamovich used his family's connections to the Austrian People's Party to secure employment in the Lower Austrian bureaucracy, a fact he openly talks about in his autobiography. He formally joined to People's Party in 1956.
In spite of his declared allegiance, his career in the Constitutional Service was materially supported by then-Chancellor Bruno Kreisky, a Social Democrat; Adamovich claims that Kreisky had a general inclination to adopt sons of prominent families as his protégés.
In 1983, Adamovich withdrew from membership in the People's Party because Kreisky was considering him for appointment to minister of justice. It was Fred Sinowatz, another Social Democrat and Kreisky's successor as chancellor, who nominated Adamovich for president of the Constitutional Court later the same year. The nomination was controversial.

During his tenure as the president of the Constitutional Court, Adamovich had his disagreements with both sides of the political spectrum.
Michael Graff, secretary general of the People's Party at the time, accused Adamovich of being a "stooge" of "the Reds".
Adamovich also quarreled with Social Democrats, especially with Heinz Fischer, who nevertheless asked Adamovich to become his advisor on matters of constitutional law when he became President of Austria in 2004.

The dispute led to personal attacks on Adamovich by Haider that commentators have described as vulgar.
When Haider accused Adamovich of misconduct in office, Adamovich insisted on being formally investigated; the inquest exonerated him roundly.

Defamation case 

In 2008, then-Minister of the Interior Günther Platter asked Adamovich to chair an inquest into the police investigation of the abduction of Natascha Kampusch.
Kampusch was a girl from Vienna who had been abducted, at age 10, in 1998; she was not heard from again until she walked away from her abductor more than eight years later. Critics alleged that Kampusch would have found been quickly and easily had investigators not committed a number of inexplicable unforced errors.
The official version of events published by the authorities when the case was finally closed was considered improbable by some. Investigators blamed the entire affair on a single criminal acting alone, even though Kampusch's abduction and captivity would have been logistically challenging and even though eyewitnesses claimed to have seen  abductors; the main suspect conveniently killed himself after Kampusch made her escape but before he could be apprehended.

In 2009, Adamovich gave a series of interviews in which he stated that he too had come to doubt the official version of events. Additionally, he speculated that Kampusch's life in captivity may not have been much worse than her earlier life with her dysfunctional family; Kampusch's mother may have been physically abusing the child; Kampusch may have stayed with her abductor more or less voluntarily.
Kampusch's mother demanded that Adamovich be prosecuted; Adamovich was found guilty of defamation and fined.
The judge presiding over his trial, Birgit Schneider, was the daughter of Otto Schneider, a former head of the Vienna prosecution service whose decisions in the Kampusch case Adamovich had also been criticizing. The family connection caused commentators such as Johann Rzeszut, a former president of the Austrian Supreme Court of Justice and a member of the inquest committee himself, to call the verdict a miscarriage of justice; according to Rzeszut, Birgit Schneider would have been obligated to recuse herself.

In 2010, Adamovich's conviction was overturned on appeal; the appellate court held that Adamovich's remarks were covered by his right to free speech.

Selected awards 

 1974: Decoration of Honor in Gold for Services to the Republic of Austria
 1979: Grand Decoration of Honor in Gold for Services to the Republic of Austria
 1987: Grand Decoration of Honor in Gold with Sash for Services to the Republic of Austria
 1989: Grand Decoration of Honor in Gold for Services to the State of Vienna
 1995: Gold medal of the Masaryk University
 1995: Wilhelm Hartel Award of the Austrian Academy of Sciences
 1996: Honorary doctorate of the University of Osijek
 1996: Franz Gschnitzer Award of the University of Innsbruck
 1997: Honorary doctorate of the University of Graz
 1998: Honorary member of the Division of Humanities and the Social Sciences of the Austrian Academy of Sciences
 2001: Grand Cross of the Order of Isabella the Catholic
 2002: Honorary doctorate of the University of Wrocław
 2002: Friedrich Torberg Medal

Publications

Standard textbooks 

The first volume was first published in 1997, the last volume in 2009; all four volumes have been revised and reprinted at least once:

Selected other books

References 

1932 births
Living people
Austrian legal scholars
University of Vienna alumni
20th-century jurists
21st-century jurists
Academic staff of the University of Graz
Presidents of the Constitutional Court of Austria
Recipients of the Grand Decoration with Sash for Services to the Republic of Austria
Marietta and Friedrich Torberg Medal recipients
Members of the European Academy of Sciences and Arts
Members of the Austrian Academy of Sciences
Austrian people of Croatian descent